Kingston is one of the 14 Parishes of Jamaica. Together with neighbouring St. Andrew Parish, it makes up the amalgamated Municipal Unit of Kingston and St. Andrew Corporation. The city of Kingston is the parish and national capital.

Kingston Parish is 25 km² in area, with a population of 89,057 at the 2011 census. The area consists of numerous neighbourhoods, mainly downtown Kingston, but also Tivoli Gardens, Denham Town, Rae Town, Kingston Gardens, National Heroes Park, Bournemouth Gardens, Norman Gardens, Rennock Lodge, Springfield, and Port Royal, along with portions of Rollington Town, Franklyn Town, and Allman Town.

References

External links
 Kingston and St. Andrew Corporation website

 
Parishes of Jamaica